USS Cacapon (AO-52) was a T3  acquired by the U.S. Navy during World War II. She served her country primarily in the Pacific Ocean Theater of Operations, and provided petroleum products where needed to combat ships. For performing this dangerous task, she was awarded battle stars and citations during World War II, the Korean War, and the Vietnam War.

Cacapon was launched 12 June 1943 at Bethlehem Sparrows Point Shipyard, Sparrows Point, Maryland, under a Maritime Commission contract; sponsored by Mrs. A. V. Doherty; acquired by the Navy 21 September 1943; and commissioned the same day.
The etymology is from a Native American word meaning "medicine waters". Cacapon River and Cacapon Mountain are in West Virginia.

World War II Pacific Theatre operations 
On 22 October 1943 Cacapon sailed from Norfolk, Virginia, to load fuel at Aruba in the West Indies en route to Pearl Harbor, where she arrived 12 November. On 30 November she rendezvoused with the U.S. 5th Fleet to deliver fuel at sea to the ships carrying out the Gilbert Islands operation. After a west coast overhaul, she returned to Pearl Harbor, from which she sailed 3 February 1944 to carry her vital logistic support to task force TF-50, then engaged in the Marshall Islands operation. She carried fuel on which all modern naval warfare depends to units of the U.S. 3rd Fleet from March into May, as the mighty task forces sent their strikes against Rabaul, Kavieng, Green, Emirau, and the Admiralties. During a part of this period, she served temporarily with the U.S. 7th Fleet's service support group for the New Guinea operation.

Cacapon served as station tanker successively at Efate and Espiritu Santo, New Hebrides; Port Purvis on Florida Island in the Solomons; and Manus, Admiralty Islands, until 8 January, when she cleared Manus for Ulithi. Here she reported to the 3rd Fleet, and between 12 and 27 January her operations supported task force TF-38 during its series of strikes against Luzon and Formosa supporting the Philippine attacks and consolidation. Cacapon lengthened the list of operations to which she had given vital support as she steamed with the 5th Fleet during the Iwo Jima operation, from 15 to 26 February, and the Okinawa operation from 24 March to 30 June. Between these, she served briefly as station tanker in San Pedro Bay, Philippine Islands.

End-of-war activity 
Cacapon brought her essential aid to the 3rd Fleet in its final devastating air attacks and bombardments on the Japanese home islands in July 1945, and on 20 September entered Tokyo Bay. Ten days later she cleared for San Pedro, California, arriving for overhaul 11 October. She returned to the Far East in December, providing support to occupation forces with a shuttle service between Yokohama, Japan, and Shanghai and Tsingtao, China.

Running aground in the Persian Gulf 
In April 1946 she sailed to Bahrain in the Persian Gulf to load oil for delivery to Kwajalein Atoll, where her cargo was to be used during Operation Crossroads. However, on the first day at sea, 24 April, she ran on Shah Allum Shoal in the Persian Gulf. While the current pulled her clear, her engine and fire rooms began to flood and all power was lost.

Supporting Antarctic operations 
On 2 December 1946, Cacapon cleared San Pedro, California, for 10 weeks in the Antarctic in Operation Highjump. She called at Sydney, Australia, en route Long Beach, California, returning home 8 April 1947. Between 1947 and 1950 she cruised in the Pacific on two extended Far Eastern tours.

Korean War operations 
Far Eastern operations continued to be the rule for Cacapon when war broke out in Korea in June 1950; she completed four lengthy tours of duty there during the three years of fighting. Sailing with the U.S. 7th Fleet and the Formosa Patrol Force, she carried fuel and supplies to these sea forces. On her first tour, during which she helped to support the amphibious landing at Inchon on 15 September 1950, she earned the Navy Unit Commendation for her high performance of duty.

From the end of hostilities in Korea through 1960, Cacapon made six more Far Eastern tours, continuing to sail with the 7th Fleet and the Taiwan Patrol Force.  In 1958 she served as the oiler replenishing the ships in Operation Hardtack, which conducted nuclear bomb tests in the lagoons of Bikini and Eniwetok, Marshall Islands.

Vietnam War operations 
During her 1955 tour she took part in the evacuation of the Tachen Islands from 6 to 14 February, and the Vietnam evacuation "Operation Passage to Freedom" of 6 to 15 March. From February to August 1958, she joined in Operation Hardtack I at Bikini Atoll. The intervals between deployments have found her operating locally from Long Beach, California.

Cacapon was the site of the 1968 strangulation of Ensign Andrew Muns.  He was murdered after uncovering a theft of $8,600 from the ship's safe by Michael LeBrun.  The Navy initially branded Ensign Muns the thief and accused him of deserting with the stolen cash.  At the insistence of the Muns' family, the case was reopened by NCIS in 1998 and a subsequent cold case investigation led to Michael LeBrun. After a lengthy interrogation, LeBrun confessed to the murder and to disposing of the body by throwing Ensign Muns into one of the oiler's massive fuel tanks.  The body was never recovered.

Final decommissioning 
She was decommissioned, and struck from the Navy List in August 1973 and transferred to the Maritime Administration for disposal. Her final disposition was to be sold for scrapping (date unknown) to Zidell Exploration Portland, Oregon.

Awards 
Cacapon received four battle stars for World War II service, and the Navy Unit Commendation and nine battle stars for Korean war service.

References

Further reading

External links 
 NavSource Online: Service Ship Photo Archive – AO-52 Cacapon

Cimarron-class oilers (1939)
Ships built in Sparrows Point, Maryland
1943 ships
World War II auxiliary ships of the United States
World War II tankers of the United States
Cold War auxiliary ships of the United States
Korean War auxiliary ships of the United States
Vietnam War auxiliary ships of the United States
Maritime incidents in November 1944